Govenia liliacea is a species of orchid. Its native range extends from Chihuahua south to Panama.

References

liliacea
Orchids of Mexico
Orchids of Central America
Plants described in 1825